Voyeur is the sixth studio album by American saxophonist David Sanborn that was released on the Warner Bros. label in 1981.

Reception
Allmusic awarded the album with 4 stars and its review by Scott Yanow states: "This 1980 recording is an excellent example of David Sanborn's music. The highly influential altoist is joined by familiar studio veterans (including guitarist Hiram Bullock and drummer Steve Gadd) with bassist/composer Marcus Miller being a key figure in creating the funky rhythms and colorful backgrounds."

The recording won the 1982 Grammy Award for Best R&B Instrumental Performance for the track "All I Need is You". This was the first of seven Grammy Awards that have been achieved by the saxophonist to date. Buzz Feiten, riding high with the Larsen-Feiten Band at the time, adds his distinctive guitar tone to Let's Just Say Goodbye.

Track listing
 "Let's Just Say Goodbye" (David Sanborn) – 4:35  
 "It's You" (Sanborn) – 5:11  
 "Wake Me When It's Over" (Sanborn, Marcus Miller) – 4:35  
 "One in a Million" (Sanborn) – 3:40
 "Run for Cover" (Miller) – 3:13
 "All I Need is You" (Miller) – 5:43
 "Just for You" (Miller) – 1:38

Personnel 
 David Sanborn – alto saxophone, Fender Rhodes (1, 2, 4), Wurlitzer electric piano (1), soprano saxophone (3, 5), percussion (4)
 Marcus Miller – bass guitar (1, 3, 5, 6), Moog bass (1, 2, 4), Fender Rhodes (3, 5, 6), Prophet-5 (3), electric guitar (3, 5, 6), drums (3), bells (6), acoustic piano (7)
 Michael Colina – Oberheim OB-X (1, 6), Prophet-5 (6)
 Buzz Feiten – electric guitar, acoustic guitar (1, 2)
 Hiram Bullock – electric guitar, percussion (4)
 Steve Gadd – drums (1, 2, 5, 6)
 Buddy Williams – drums (4), percussion (4)
 Lenny Castro – percussion (1, 2, 4), congas (2, 4), timbales (2)
 Ray Bardani – gong (3) 
 Ralph MacDonald – percussion (6)
 Tom Scott – flute (5), tenor saxophone (5)
 Patti Austin – backing vocals (2)
 Kacey Cisyk – backing vocals (2)
 Lani Groves – backing vocals (2, 6)
 Valerie Simpson – backing vocals (2)
 Diva Gray – backing vocals (6)
 Gordon Grody – backing vocals (6)
 Hamish Stuart – backing vocals (6)

Production 
 Ray Bardani – producer, recording, mixing 
 Michael Colina – producer
 George Marino – mastering at Sterling Sound (New York, NY).
 Katherine Jewel – album coordinator
 Claire Moriece – production coordinator
 Christine Sauers – art direction, design 
 Leonard F. Konopelski – illustration, lettering 
 Patrick Raines – management

Awards

Grammy Awards

References

1981 albums
David Sanborn albums
Albums produced by Michael Colina
Warner Records albums